Secco is a surname of Italian origin, which means dry. It may refer to:

Alessio Secco (b. 1970), Italian professional football manager
Deborah Secco (b. 1979), Brazilian actress
Louis Secco (b. 1927), Canadian Olympic ice hockey player
Secco (first name unknown), a character in the Netflix adult animated series Tear Along the Dotted Line

See also
Secco, a musical term meaning "dry", "without resonance" or "quick"
Secco or Fresco-secco, a type of mural painting where paint is applied to dry plaster on a wall
Secco, the cult and lifestyle

Italian-language surnames